Algimantas "Algis" Ignatavicius (11 October 1932 – 16 May 2022) was an Australian basketball player. He competed in the men's tournament at the 1956 Summer Olympics.

References

1932 births
2022 deaths
Australian men's basketball players
Olympic basketball players of Australia
Basketball players at the 1956 Summer Olympics
Sportspeople from Kaunas
Australian people of Lithuanian descent